Mohammad Nabil Aslam (born 3 August 1984) is a retired Pakistani footballer who played as a defender.

A versatile defender, Aslam primarily is a centre back, although he is a capable full back on either side. Physically strong and composed, he garnered a reputation as a tough-tackling, versatile defender.

Club career

BK Frem
Aslam started his career at Brøndby IF before moving to BK Frem where he developed from the youth ranks to the main team. After spending a few seasons at Frem he left the club.

Loan to Hvidovre IF
Aslam was loaned out to Hvidovre IF in February 2004 together with his teammate Ali Sheihi. His season at Hvidovre was so good, that Frem wanted to get him back and playing him on the second team.

Back to BK Frem
After he went back from his loan stay, he established himself as an important player for the first team squad and was rewarded with a contract until 2007. He became a very important player for the club and extend his contract once again, when it expired in 2007. Despite his young age, he played in 100 matches for the club, before leaving it in the summer 2008.

AC Horsens
He joined AC Horsens in July 2008 and established himself as an integral part of the team reaching the final of 2011–12 Danish Cup, later helping Horsens reach the Europa League play-off round in the 2012-13 season.

After only 2 days at the club, he suffered from an injury in his back. After 10 league matches in his first season, he extended his contract in the summer 2009 until 2012. AC Horsens was relegated to the Danish 1st Division in after his first season.

Aslam had a good 2009/10 season until October, where he unfortunately slammed his shoulder out of joint and was out for the rest of the year. He went back from the injury in February 2011. AC Horsens was promoted back to the Danish Superliga after this season.

But the new season in the Danish Superliga didn't start well for Aslam. In August 2011, he suffered an anterior cruciate ligament injury He was out for two months. In January 2012, he extended his contract once again, this time until 2015. In the 2012/13 season, Aslam suffered many injuries.

After Johnny Mølby was appointed as the manager for the 2013/14 season, Aslam revealed that he wanted to leave the club because he didn't expect to play. He remained at the club but got injured once again. After only 7 games for the club in the Danish 1st Division, his contract was terminated by AC Horsens in May 2014http://www.bold.dk/fodbold/nyheder/Horsens-ophaever-med-Aslam/ Horsens ophæver med Aslam]‚ bold.dk, 22 May 2014 He played 116 games in the yellow shirt.

In February 2015, he was called by Pakistan national team to play for the 2018 FIFA World Cup qualification match against Yemen. He made his debut for Pakistan in a 3–1 defeat against Yemen in the first-leg of the 2018 World Cup qualifiers.

AB
Aslam signed for AB in August 2014 on a free transfer. In December 2014, AB announced that Aslam wouldn't continue at the club for the rest of the season, but instead would be playing for at Thailand club. However, they didn't confirm which club he was going to play for.

Svebølle B&I
Three months after he left AB, he signed for Danish 2nd Division club Svebølle B&I.

In October 2015, Aslam together with Ken Fagerberg was invited to play a friendly match for Jönköpings Södra IF.

Kalundborg GB
Aslam joined Denmark Series club Kalundborg GB in July 2015.

Glostrup FK
He joined Glostrup FK for the 2016/17 season

VB 1968
Aslam joined VB 1968 for the 2017/18 season.

Violence episode
In June 2010, the AC Horsens players were out celebrating their promotion to the Danish Superliga for the 2010/11 season. Their happened some things at the nightclub and Aslam was arrested together with his teammate Martin Spelmann. He was later sentenced 30 days in prison and 30 hours of community service. AC Horsens chose not to punish him.

Aslam recognized, that he that night punched a man in the face but that it was to defend himself. Anyway, he was charged.

After the episode, Aslam said “Of course I regret my action and I am ready to take my Punishment.”

Honours

Club
AC Horsens
 Danish 1st Division: 2009–10
 Danish Cup: Runner-up: 2012

References

External links

 Pakistan national team profile
 
 
  Hvidovre Fanklub profile

1984 births
Living people
Danish people of Pakistani descent
Danish men's footballers
Pakistan international footballers
Pakistani footballers
Pakistani expatriate footballers
Boldklubben Frem players
Hvidovre IF players
AC Horsens players
Akademisk Boldklub players
Danish Superliga players
Association football defenders
People from Kongens Lyngby
Sportspeople from the Capital Region of Denmark